Bani Ma'ain is a sub-district located in Hubaysh District, Ibb Governorate, Yemen. Bani Ma'ain had a population of 5591 according to the 2004 census.

References 

Sub-districts in Hubaysh District